The Apsheronsk narrow-gauge railway (Apsheronskya uzkokoleynaya zheleznaya doroga) is a mountain narrow-gauge railway located in Krasnodar Krai, Russia.

Current status 

It carries freight (including: wood, food, and postal services) and passengers, including a train which transports children to school. The Head Office of the railway is located in Apsheronsk.

Rolling stock

Locomotives 
 TU7 – № 2540, 2629
 TU7A – № 3219
 TU6P - № 0053
 TU8P - № 0005
 GMD-4 railcar
 TD-5U «Pioneer» - transportation for local residents

Locomotives Shpalorez-Express
 TU4 – № 3003
 TU7A – № 3307
 TU8 – № 0148

Railroad car
 Boxcar
 Flatcars
 Snowplow СО750
 Passenger cars PV40

Guamka Tourist Railway

In stanitsa Samurskaya (part of village Novyye Polyany) the railroad was divided into two lines – a branch line turned left from the main line, on southwest, into the mountains of southern Adygea, where it ended in settlement Guzeripl (via tourist resort Lago-Naki). Terminal parts of this line have been canceled already during the 70's, while in the end of the 80's has been dismantled connection with the main line. Presently remains isolated section of this branch line, roughly 8 kilometres length, which goes through attractive gorge of the Kurdzhips River between settlements Guamka and Mezmay. This railroad is since 2017, after repairing of serious damages caused by landslides, used for tourist transport only.

Locomotives 
 TU8 – № 0427

Railroad car 
 Passenger cars PV40
 Snowplow СО750
 Tank car
 Flatcars

Stations
00 km - Apsheronsk (The track was dismantled in 2010)
15 km - 15 km (The track was dismantled in 2010)
24 km - Samurskaya (The track was dismantled in 2010)
31 km - Chernigovskoye 
40 km - Passing loop "10 km" - Kushinka
44 km - Rezhet
48 km - Lower Tubyi
52 km - Middle Tubyi
59 km - Otdalenyy (formerly Shpalorez)

Gallery

See also
Narrow-gauge railways in Russia

References and sources

External links

 Official Website 
 Official Website Tourist trains Shpalorez-Express 
 Official Shpalorez-Express Facebook 
 The article in the English language, website (2009)
 Photo - project «Steam Engine» 
 Apsheronsk narrow-gauge railway (interactive map) 
 Guamka Conyon Photos 
 «The site of the railroad» S. Bolashenko 
Railway lines opened in 1927
Rail transport in Krasnodar Krai
750 mm gauge railways in Russia
Logging railways in Russia